This is a list of provincial parks in the Canadian province of Alberta. These provincial parks are maintained by Alberta Parks. For a list of protected areas in Alberta, see the List of protected areas of Alberta.

Provincial Parks
Provincial parks are established under the Provincial Parks Act to "support outdoor recreation, heritage tourism and natural heritage appreciation activities that depend on and are compatible with the natural environment". Provincial Parks differ from Wildland Provincial Parks in that the former have better road access and allow a greater range of activities for users. Provincial Parks have a focus on a variety of outdoor recreational uses and enjoyment of the natural environment.

Wildland Parks
Wildland provincial parks are established under the Provincial Parks Act to "preserve and protect natural heritage and provide opportunities for backcountry recreation". "Wildland provincial parks are large, undeveloped natural landscapes that retain their primeval character." Wildland Parks are more remote and offer more difficult access than Provincial Parks. In addition, recreational activities are more limited to minimize visitor impacts on the natural environment.

Willmore Wilderness Park
Willmore Wilderness Park was established in 1959 and is managed under the Willmore Wilderness Park Act. The intent of Willmore Wilderness Park is the preservation of the natural environment, similar to the more recent Wildland Parks.

References

Alberta
Provincial parks
Alberta